This is a list of songs that reached number one on the Billboard magazine Streaming Songs chart in 2016.

Chart history

See also
2016 in music
List of Billboard Hot 100 number-one singles of 2016

References

United States Streaming Songs
Streaming 2016